Nikhil Nanda is an Indian businessman. Part of the Nanda family, Kapoor family and Bachchan Family, he is the chairman and managing director of Escorts Limited, an engineering company founded in 1944 by his paternal grandfather, Har Prasad Nanda.

Early life and background
Nikhil Nanda was born on 18 March 1974 in New Delhi, Delhi, India to a Punjabi Hindu family. His father, Rajan Nanda from Fazilka, was an industrialist and the chairman and managing director of Escorts Group, while his mother, Ritu Nanda, worked as an insurance agent for Life Insurance Corporation of India. His maternal grandfather was actor-director Raj Kapoor and his great-grandfather, Prithviraj Kapoor, was an actor. Actors Rishi Kapoor, Randhir Kapoor and Rajiv Kapoor are his maternal uncles, while actresses Neetu Singh and Babita Kapoor are his aunts by marriage. Actors Karisma Kapoor, Kareena Kapoor, Ranbir Kapoor, Armaan Jain and Aadar Jain are his maternal first cousins.

Nanda attended the Doon School in Dehradun, and went on to study business management at Wharton School of the University of Pennsylvania, where he majored in finance and marketing.

Career 
Nanda served as Chief Operating Officer from October 2005, then as Joint Managing Director of Escorts Limited from September 2007 when he became managing director of Escorts Limited in September 2013. He was appointed Chairman on 7 August 2018 after the death of his father. He was one of five Indians selected as the Global Leaders of Tomorrow by the World Economic Forum in Geneva, in 2001.

Personal life
Nanda married Shweta Bachchan, daughter of film actors Amitabh Bachchan and Jaya Bachchan, on 16 February 1997. They have two children named Navya Naveli Nanda and Agastya Nanda.

References

1974 births
Living people
Wharton School of the University of Pennsylvania alumni
People from Delhi
Businesspeople from Delhi
The Doon School alumni
Kapoor family